The Day That Shook the World (lit. The Sarajevo Assassination) is a 1975 Czechoslovak-Yugoslav-German co-production film directed by Veljko Bulajić, starring Christopher Plummer and Florinda Bolkan.  The film is about the assassination of Archduke Franz Ferdinand and his wife Sophie in Sarajevo in 1914 and the immediate aftermath that led to the outbreak of World War I.

When the only surviving heir to Emperor Franz Joseph of Austria-Hungary, Archduke Franz Ferdinand, was killed by Gavrilo Princip, a Serbian nationalist, on 28 June 1914, his death set in motion a chain of events that resulted in the First World War. The movie chronicles the events surrounding that death and its aftermath. The assassination gave the Germans and Austrians reason to fear that the Russian Empire was actively fomenting unrest in the Balkans, since Serbia was a bone of contention throughout the region.

Cast
 Christopher Plummer as Archduke Franz Ferdinand
 Florinda Bolkan as Sophie, Duchess of Hohenberg
 Maximilian Schell as Đuro Šarac
 Irfan Mensur as Gavrilo Princip
 Radoš Bajić as Nedeljko Čabrinović
 Ivan Vyskočil as Mehmed Mehmedbašić
 Libuše Šafránková as Yelena
 Otomar Korbelář as Franz Joseph I of Austria
 Wilhelm Koch-Hooge as Franz Conrad
 Jiří Holý as Erich von Merizzi
  as Countess Langus
 Jiří Kodet as Morsley

Release
The film was released to cinemas on October 31, 1975. In addition to Yugoslavia, it was released to Bulgaria, West Germany, Hungary, Poland, Romania, USSR, Algeria, Lebanon, India, Nepal, Albania, and China. It was released to the United States two years later.

On January 6, 2011, it was released on DVD.

Awards
The film won one award at the 1976 San Sebastián International Film Festival in the Special Mention category. The film was also selected as the Yugoslav entry for the Best Foreign Language Film at the 48th Academy Awards, but was not accepted as a nominee. The film also earned director Veljko Bulajic a Silver Arena award at the 1976 Yugoslav National Film Awards (today known as the Pula Film Festival).

See also
 List of submissions to the 48th Academy Awards for Best Foreign Language Film
 List of Yugoslav submissions for the Academy Award for Best Foreign Language Film

References

External links

 http://movies.nytimes.com/movie/review?res=9506EEDD1539E334BC4C51DFB766838C669EDE

1975 films
Yugoslav historical drama films
Serbo-Croatian-language films
English-language Yugoslav films
Films directed by Veljko Bulajić
Jadran Film films
Political films based on actual events
Films set in 1914
Films set in Sarajevo
Films set in Bosnia and Herzegovina
Films about assassinations
Czechoslovak multilingual films
West German films
English-language German films
Czech historical drama films
English-language Czech films
Croatian drama films
German political films
German multilingual films
Yugoslav multilingual films
1975 multilingual films
Cultural depictions of Archduke Franz Ferdinand of Austria
Cultural depictions of Gavrilo Princip
Films about the assassination of Archduke Franz Ferdinand of Austria
Cultural depictions of Franz Joseph I of Austria
Yugoslav World War I films
German World War I films
Czech World War I films